Brown County is a county in the U.S. state of Minnesota. As of the 2020 census, the population was 25,912. Its county seat is New Ulm. The county was formed in 1855 and organized in 1856.

Brown County comprises the New Ulm, MN Micropolitan Statistical Area and is included in the Mankato-New Ulm-North Mankato, MN Combined Statistical Area.

History
Brown County was founded in 1855 in the southwest corner of what was Minnesota Territory. It was named for Joseph Renshaw Brown, a member of the Governor's Council of the Territory in 1855. In 1857, Brown County was divided, creating Cottonwood, Jackson, Martin, Murry, Nobles,  Pipestone, and Rock counties. Watonwan was broken off in 1860. Redwood was created from a large portion of Brown County in 1862. Redwood was further divided into Lac qui Parle, Lincoln, Lyon and Yellow Medicine Counties in the 1870s. In 1862, the county's 150-mile northern border was the boundary line of the Upper and Lower Sioux reservations when hostilities broke out.  New Ulm, the county seat, came under heavy attack twice by a superior Mdewakanton Dacotah force that was repulsed. Most of the town was torched and most of the population fled to St. Peter and Mankato. The town took many casualties, with the dead buried in the streets. In 1863, when the treaties with the eastern Dacotah were annulled and the two reservations were dissolved, the county border was moved north 10 miles to the Minnesota River.

Geography
The Minnesota River flows east-southeast along the county's northern border. The Cottonwood River flows east-northeast through the county's central and upper area, discharging into the Minnesota at the northern border. The Little Cottonwood River flows east through the lower portion of the county, on its way to discharge into the Minnesota in neighboring Blue Earth County. The terrain consists of rolling hills, mostly devoted to agriculture, and generally slopes to the east, tending to drop into the river valleys. Its highest point is at its southwestern corner, at 1,263' (385m) ASL.

Major highways

  U.S. Highway 14
  Minnesota State Highway 4
  Minnesota State Highway 15
  Minnesota State Highway 68
  Minnesota State Highway 257

Adjacent counties

 Nicollet County - northeast
 Blue Earth County - southeast
 Watonwan County - south
 Cottonwood County - southwest
 Redwood County - west
 Renville County - northwest

Lakes

Most of the county is an area of rich farm land; most of its wetlands were drained for use in agriculture, leaving a number of lakes. The county has at least 32 lakes, some of which are deemed to be "protected waters" of the State of Minnesota; these are designated with "(p)" below.

The lakes occupy "hollows in the driftsheet";  many have neither an inflow nor an outflow.

Lakes in the county include:
 Altermatt Lake (p)
 Bachelor Lake (p), in Stark township
 Boise Lake (p)
 Clear Lake (p)
 Gilman Lake (p)
 Horseshoe Lake
 Juni Lake (p), named for Benedict Juni, a Swiss settler.
 Lake Cottonwood (p)
 Lake Hanska (p)
 Linden Lake (p)
 Lone Tree Lake (p)
 Omsrud Lake (p)
 School Lake (p), named for its location in school section 16.
 Sleepy Eye Lake (p)
 Zanders Lake (p)

Climate and weather

Demographics

2000 census
As of the 2000 census, there were 26,911 people, 10,598 households, and 7,164 families in the county. The population density was 44.0/sqmi (17.0/km2). There were 11,163 housing units at an average density of 18.3/sqmi (7.05/km2). The racial makeup of the county was 97.82% White, 0.10% Black or African American, 0.12% Native American, 0.41% Asian, 0.01% Pacific Islander, 0.91% from other races, and 0.63% from two or more races. 2.03% of the population were Hispanic or Latino of any race. 67.1% were of German and 9.6% Norwegian ancestry.

There were 10,598 households, out of which 31.50% had children under the age of 18 living with them, 57.30% were married couples living together, 6.90% had a female householder with no husband present, and 32.40% were non-families. 29.00% of all households were made up of individuals, and 14.30% had someone living alone who was 65 years of age or older. The average household size was 2.43 and the average family size was 3.00.

The county population contained 25.30% under the age of 18, 9.70% from 18 to 24, 25.60% from 25 to 44, 21.90% from 45 to 64, and 17.50% who were 65 years of age or older. The median age was 38 years. For every 100 females there were 98.20 males. For every 100 females age 18 and over, there were 95.90 males.

The median income for a household in the county was $39,800, and the median income for a family was $49,811. Males had a median income of $32,347 versus $23,918 for females. The per capita income for the county was $19,535. About 4.40% of families and 6.40% of the population were below the poverty line, including 7.00% of those under age 18 and 9.80% of those age 65 or over.

2020 Census

Communities

Cities

 Cobden
 Comfrey (partial)
 Evan
 Hanska
 New Ulm (county seat)
 Sleepy Eye
 Springfield

Census-designated place
 Searles

Unincorporated communities
 Essig
 Godahl (partial)
 Leavenworth

Townships

 Albin Township
 Bashaw Township
 Burnstown Township
 Cottonwood Township
 Eden Township
 Home Township
 Lake Hanska Township
 Leavenworth Township
 Linden Township
 Milford Township
 Mulligan Township
 North Star Township
 Prairieville Township
 Sigel Township
 Stark Township
 Stately Township

Government and politics
Brown County has traditionally voted Republican. As of 2020, the county has not supported the Democratic nominee for president since 1964.

See also
 National Register of Historic Places listings in Brown County, Minnesota

Footnotes

Works cited

Further reading
 Louis Albert Fritsche, History of Brown County, Minnesota: Its People, Industries and Institutions. In Two Volumes. Indianapolis, IN: B.F. Bowen and Co., 1916.

External links
 Brown County official website
 City of New Ulm (County Seat)

 
Minnesota counties
1856 establishments in Minnesota Territory
Populated places established in 1856